Gorman is a census-designated place (CDP) along the North Branch Potomac River in southern Garrett County, Maryland, United States. As of the 2010 census, Gorman's population was 106. Gorman lies on Gorman Road (Maryland Route 560) off the Northwestern Turnpike (U.S. Route 50), which crosses the North Branch into Gormania, West Virginia, via Gormania Bridge. Like Gormania, the town is named for United States Senator from Maryland, Arthur Pue Gorman (March 11, 1839 – June 4, 1906).

Demographics

References

Census-designated places in Garrett County, Maryland
Northwestern Turnpike
Populated places on the North Branch Potomac River